The church of San Tomaso Becket, commonly known as the church of San Tomaso Cantuariense, is a church situated in the central Verona, near the Ponte Nuovo del Popolo.

The present church was built by Carmelites to replace two 14th-century churches, one dedicated to St Thomas Becket (1316), the other to the Annunciation (1351). The architect Michele Sammicheli designed the plans during 1545-1550. The façade remains incomplete. The portal of the church was transferred here from Santa Maria Mater Domini in Valdonega. The bell tower, with ten bells, was completed in 1400. The church has artworks by Paolo Farinati, Francesco Torbido, Girolamo dai Libri, Antonio Balestra, and Alessandro Turchi. The organ is known to have been used on 27 December 1769, by a young Mozart.

The bell tower has a ring of ten bells in D, rung with the Veronese bellringing art.

Sources

 G.Borelli, Chiese e monasteri di Verona (1980); Banca popolare di Verona, Verona
 Guide to churches of Verona

Tomaso
Romanesque architecture in Verona
16th-century Roman Catholic church buildings in Italy
Roman Catholic churches completed in 1550
1550 establishments in the Republic of Venice